Eileithyia Cave (also the Cave of Eileithyia) was a sacred cave dedicated to the goddess of childbirth, Eileithyia, on the island of Crete, that was used from the Neolithic era to the Roman, with worship flourishing in the Late Minoan period. It has been suggested that rock formations within the cave resemble female figures, most prominently a stalagmite in the centre that appears as a standing female.

Geography
The cave is located one kilometer south of the town of Amnisos.

Mythology
The cave is mentioned in Odysseus's Cretan narrative to Penelope in the Odyssey.

Archaeology
The Eileithyia Cave was occupied by prehistoric human settlers from the Neolithic period until around 400 BCE. The archaeological finds made in the cave are on display at the Iraklion Museum and the Archaeological Museum of Iraklion. Pottery ranging from the Neolithic to Roman periods has been discovered in the cave, with the most significant number of finds coming from the Minoan era. Four anthropomorphic vases from the Orientalizing period, which could be of Greek origin were found in the sanctuary. They are similar to Egyptian vases that show Isis nursing her infant son Horus. The sanctuary is the largest collection of Egyptian and Egyptianizing artifacts on Crete.
The cave was discovered by Christoforos Anerrapsis of Candia.

References

External links
 http://www.ellada.com/creteiraklion.html

Neolithic sites in Crete
Landforms of Heraklion (regional unit)
Minoan sites in Crete
Ancient caves of Greece
Landforms of Crete
Mycenaean Crete
Mycenaean sites